Progress M1-8, identified by NASA as Progress 7P, was a Progress spacecraft used to resupply the International Space Station. It was a Progress-M1 11F615A55 spacecraft, with the serial number 257.

Launch
Progress M1-8 was launched by a Soyuz-U carrier rocket from Site 1/5 at the Baikonur Cosmodrome. Launch occurred at 20:13:39 UTC on 21 March 2002.

Docking
The spacecraft docked with the aft port of the Zvezda module at 20:57:56 UTC on 24 March 2002. It remained docked for 93 days before undocking at 08:26:30 UTC on 25 June 2002 to make way for Progress M-46. It was deorbited at 11:35:00 UTC on the same day. The spacecraft burned up in the atmosphere over the Pacific Ocean, with any remaining debris landing in the ocean at around 12:26:52 UTC.

Progress M1-8 carried supplies to the International Space Station, including food, water and oxygen for the crew and equipment for conducting scientific research.

See also

 List of Progress flights
 Uncrewed spaceflights to the International Space Station

References

Progress (spacecraft) missions
Supply vehicles for the International Space Station
Spacecraft launched in 2002
Spacecraft which reentered in 2002
Spacecraft launched by Soyuz-U rockets